Kasher (hebrew: כשר) is a Hebrew surname meaning "fit" and in the common context, fit for consumption by Jews according to traditional Jewish law.

It may refer to:
Tim Kasher - an American musician
Aryeh Kasher - an Israeli history emeritus professor 
Asa Kasher - an Israeli philosopher and linguist 
Menachem Mendel Kasher - a Polish-born rabbi
Moshe Kasher - American comedian and actor 
Joe Kasher - English footballer

Hebrew-language surnames
Jewish surnames